Cobweb（) is an upcoming South Korean film directed by Kim Jee-woon starring Song Kang-ho, Im Soo-jung, Oh Jung-se, Jeon Yeo-been, and Krystal Jung.

Synopsis 
Cobweb is about director Kim (Song Kang-ho), who is obsessed with the fact that the ending of the movie 'Cobweb', which was filmed in the 1970s, will be better if re-filmed. It is a film that depicts the sad and funny things that happen while filming under conditions.

Cast

Main 
 Song Kang-ho as director Kim
 A movie director who is obsessed with the desire to make 'Cobweb' into a masterpiece.
 Im Soo-jung as Lee Min-mi
 A veteran actress who plays Kang Ho-se's wife in the movie 'Cobweb'.
 Oh Jung-se as Kang Ho-se
 Popular playboy actor who is the male protagonist of 'Cobweb'.
 Jeon Yeo-been as Shin Mi-do
 Person in charge of finance of Shin Sung Filim, which produces the movie 'Cobweb'.
 Krystal Jung as Han Yu-rim
 A new actress who is rapidly growing in popularity in 'Cobweb'.

Supporting 
 Jung In-ki as Hunter 
 Aa long time colleague of director Kim.
 Jang Nam-yeol as Park Joo-sa
 A literary scholar who visits the filming site of the movie 'Cobweb'.
 Park Jung-soo as Mrs. Oh
 Director Kim's regular actress who says that she will appear only for money.
 Shin Sung-pil as Mr. Baek
 The producer of the movie 'Cobweb'
 Kim Min-jae as Chief Kim
 Kim Dong-young as an assistant director who worked with director Kim for a long time

Special appearance 
 Jung Woo-sung

Production 
Principal photography began on March 8, 2022 and concluded on June 6, 2022.

References

External links
 
 
 

Upcoming films
South Korean black comedy films
Films about films
2020s Korean-language films
2020s South Korean films